In Harmony: A Sesame Street Record and In Harmony 2 are two compilation albums of children's music performed by various artists, released in 1980 and 1981, respectively. Of the two albums, only the first album charted, reaching No. 156 on the Billboard 200. The Doobie Brothers' cover of "Wynken, Blynken and Nod" was the only single release to chart, when it reached No. 76 on the Billboard Hot 100 singles chart. A second single, Al Jarreau's "One Good Turn", failed to chart.  The first album was released on Sesame Street Records through Warner Bros. Records, and is the only album in the series with a direct connection to the popular children's series Sesame Street, as it includes a song performed by the characters Ernie and Cookie Monster The second album was released on Columbia Records, and while no Muppet-related content appears on the album, the credits state that a "royalty is being donated to the Children's Television Workshop and various children's charities" from its proceeds. Each album won the Grammy Award for Best Recording for Children, at the 23rd Annual Grammy Awards and 25th Annual Grammy Awards, respectively. The Grammys were awarded to the producers, David Levine and Lucy Simon.

Bruce Springsteen's performance of "Santa Claus Is Comin' to Town", which appears on the second album, was recorded live at C. W. Post College in Brookville, New York on December 12, 1975. Springsteen's rendition of the song has received radio airplay perennially at Christmastime for years; it has appeared on Billboard magazine's Hot Singles Recurrents chart each year from 2002 to 2009 due to seasonal airplay. In Harmony 2 marks the first appearance of the recording on an album, although it was later released as the B-side of Springsteen's single "My Hometown" in 1985 and has since been released on several other compilations.

Awards
Grammy Awards

Track listings
In Harmony 
"Wynken, Blynken, and Nod" - The Doobie Brothers
"Jellyman Kelly" - James Taylor
"Be With Me" - Carly Simon
"Blueberry Pie" - Bette Midler
"Share" - Ernie and Cookie Monster
"One Good Turn" - Al Jarreau
"I Want a Horse" - Linda Ronstadt and Wendy Waldman
"The Sailor and the Mermaid" - Libby Titus and Dr. John
"Pajamas" - Livingston Taylor
"A Friend for All Seasons" - George Benson and Pauline Wilson
"I Have a Song" - Lucy Simon
"In Harmony" - Kate Taylor and The Simon/Taylor Family

In Harmony 2 
"Nobody Knows But Me" - Billy Joel
"Sunny Skies" - James Taylor
"The Owl and the Pussycat" - Lou Rawls and Deniece Williams
"Reach Out and Touch (Somebody's Hand)" - Teddy Pendergrass
"Ginny the Flying Girl" - Janis Ian
"Here Comes the Rainbow" - Crystal Gayle
"Splish Splash" - Dr. John
"Some Kitties Don't Care" - Kenny Loggins
"Maryanne" - Carly and Lucy Simon
"Santa Claus Is Comin' to Town" - Bruce Springsteen

Charts
Album – Billboard (North America)

References

External links
In Harmony: A Sesame Street Record at Muppet Wiki

1980 compilation albums
1982 compilation albums
Children's music albums
Columbia Records compilation albums
Compilation album series
Sesame Street albums
Warner Records compilation albums